Boubacar Diabang Dialiba (born July 13, 1988) is a Senegalese professional footballer who plays as a left winger for Turkish club Ankara Keçiörengücü.

He also played for the Bosnia and Herzegovina U21 national team and the full international Senegal national team. Apart from his Senegalese passport, Dialiba also holds a Bosnian passport as well.

International career
On 26 March 2008, Dialiba made his debut with Bosnia and Herzegovina U21 in a 2009 UEFA European Under-21 Championship qualification match against Wales U21 after being named in the starting line-up and scored his side's only goal during a 1–2 home defeat. After three years and 11 months, respectively on 29 February 2012, he made his debut with Senegal in a friendly match against South Africa after coming on as a substitute at 64th minute in place of Dame N'Doye.

Career statistics

Club

International

Honours
Yeni Malatyaspor
TFF First League runner-up: 2016–17

References

External links

1988 births
Living people
Footballers from Dakar
Bosnia and Herzegovina people of Senegalese descent
Association football wingers
Senegalese footballers
Bosnia and Herzegovina footballers
Bosnia and Herzegovina youth international footballers
FK Željezničar Sarajevo players
Real Murcia players
K.V. Mechelen players
MKS Cracovia (football) players
Yeni Malatyaspor footballers
Giresunspor footballers
Ümraniyespor footballers
Ankara Keçiörengücü S.K. footballers
Premier League of Bosnia and Herzegovina players
Segunda División players
Belgian Pro League players
Ekstraklasa players
TFF First League players
Senegalese expatriate footballers
Expatriate footballers in Bosnia and Herzegovina
Expatriate footballers in Spain
Senegalese expatriate sportspeople in Spain
Expatriate footballers in Belgium
Senegalese expatriate sportspeople in Belgium
Expatriate footballers in Poland
Senegalese expatriate sportspeople in Poland
Expatriate footballers in Turkey
Senegalese expatriate sportspeople in Turkey